SPAM Jam (formerly known as Cedar River days) is a yearly festival of the popular meat product Spam. It is held in Austin, Minnesota, where Hormel food company produces the meat.

The festival spans from July 1 to 7 and includes fireworks, parades, games, a carnival, and of course, the mysterious meat itself. Each year, those who enter the city during the festivities are likely to see copious amounts of blue and yellow (the colors of the packaging), and myriad dancing men and women in large SPAM can costumes.

The 2005 event hosted such guests as Bill Nye the Science Guy, Kurtwood Smith, Jerry Turner the auditor and Jim Belushi. Highlighting the 2007 event is the second annual SPAM Fritters eating competition, with 2006 Champion David "Processed Meat Paws" Stauber returning to defend his title mark of 856 fritters.

Hawaii

Spam Jam is also celebrated annually in Honolulu, Hawaii during the last week of April where it is quickly becoming one of the most popular festivals in Hawaii because of its great food and entertainment in a family-friendly atmosphere. Local residents and visitors alike have made this an annual tradition. In 2009, an estimated 20,000 people attended the event.

Kalakaua Avenue, the main street in Waikiki, is closed to car traffic during the event, and various entertainment stages are set up on the street. Between the stages, several of Honolulu's finest restaurants will be serving up Spam in many different ways. Several merchandise tents sell Spam-themed items including T-shirts, shorts, sport balls, and slippers. A variety of Hawaiian craft booths will also be set up on the street.

Introduced in 1937 by Hormel Foods, more Spam is consumed per person in Hawaii than in any other state in the United States. Almost seven million cans of Spam are eaten every year in Hawaii.

External links
 

Food and drink festivals in the United States
Tourist attractions in Mower County, Minnesota
Hormel Foods
Festivals in Minnesota
Festivals in Hawaii
Spam (food)
Waikiki
April observances
Honolulu